Reginald Reynolds Amponsah (30 December 1919 – 3 June 2009) was a Ghanaian potter and politician of the first Parliament of the Second Republic representing the Mampong North constituency in the Ashanti region of Ghana. He was a Minister of State in the Busia government.

Education
Amponsah completed his secondary education at the Achimota School in 1942. He was the school prefect for his year. Among his mates there were Victor Owusu, K. B. Asante, and Silas Dodu. He was awarded  a scholarship to study pottery at Stoke on Trent in the  United Kingdom.

Politics

First republic
Amponsah was in opposition with the United Party in the first republic. Kwame Nkrumah's government, he was accused of plotting to overthrow the Convention People's Party government along with Victor Owusu, Apaloo, William Ofori Atta, Dzenkle Dzewu Joe Appiah and  Major Awhaitey. During a BBC interview, he said about his arrest in 1958 that

A British police officer came to me and said “you are under arrest",  "He pulled a gun and said “come at once or I will blow your head off."

Amponsah was jailed without trial under the Preventive Detention Act. He stayed there from 1958 until the coup d'état of 24 February 1966 which brought down the government of Kwame Nkrumah.

Second republic
Amponsah was appointed by Kofi Abrefa Busia as Minister for Lands, Mineral Resources, Forestry and Wildlife in his Progress Party government. He was later appointed Education minister and initiated the process for reforms in basic education in Ghana.

Fourth republic
During the fourth republic, he was the  Chairman of the Council of Elders of the New Patriotic Party (NPP). He was influential in uniting various factions within the NPP leading up to the 2008 presidential and parliamentary elections.

Other activities
Amponsah was chairman of the now-defunct Ghana Airways airline in the 1960s.

Personal life
Amponsah was born at Daaman near Asante Mampong in the Sekyere West District of the Ashanti Region of Ghana. He was married with four children. He was buried on 3 September 2009 at Adudwan, also near Asante Mampong.

References

1919 births
2009 deaths
Ghanaian MPs 1969–1972
Alumni of Achimota School
Government ministers of Ghana
United Party (Ghana) politicians
New Patriotic Party politicians
People from Ashanti Region
Ghanaian civil servants
Progress Party (Ghana) politicians
Potters
20th-century Ghanaian politicians
Leaders of organizations